The 1963–64 Serie A season was won by Bologna.

Teams
Messina, Bari and Lazio had been promoted from Serie B.

Final classification

Results

Championship tie-breaker
With both Inter and Bologna level on 54 points, a play-off match was conducted to decide the champion for the first and only time in Serie A history.

Relegation tie-breaker

Modena relegated to Serie B.

Top goalscorers

Footnotes

References and sources
Almanacco Illustrato del Calcio – La Storia 1898–2004, Panini Edizioni, Modena, September 2005

External links
 All results on RSSSF Website.

Serie A seasons
Italy
1963–64 in Italian football leagues